The Images may refer to:

 The Images (band), UK music group
 The Images (Tasmania), set of rocky islets off Tasmania